Neocompsa is a genus of beetles in the family Cerambycidae, containing the following species:

 Neocompsa agnosta (Martins, 1970)
 Neocompsa alacris (Bates, 1885)
 Neocompsa albopilosa (Martins, 1962)
 Neocompsa aspasia (Martins, 1974)
 Neocompsa bimaculata (Martins & Napp, 1986)
 Neocompsa chemsaki (Martins, 1970)
 Neocompsa clerochroa (Thomson, 1867)
 Neocompsa comula (Martins, 1970)
 Neocompsa cylindricollis (Fabricius, 1798)
 Neocompsa dysthymia (Martins, 1970)
 Neocompsa eburioides (Thomson, 1867)
 Neocompsa exclamationis (Thomson, 1860)
 Neocompsa fefeyei (Joly, 1991)
 Neocompsa fulgens (Fisher, 1932)
 Neocompsa gaumeri (Bates, 1892)
 Neocompsa giesberti (Martins & Napp, 1986)
 Neocompsa glaphyra (Martins, 1970)
 Neocompsa habra (Martins, 1970)
 Neocompsa intricata (Martins, 1970)
 Neocompsa leechi (Martins, 1970)
 Neocompsa lenticula (Martins, 1970)
 Neocompsa limatula (Martins & Napp, 1986)
 Neocompsa lineolata (Bates, 1870)
 Neocompsa longipilis (Martins & Galileo, 2002)
 Neocompsa macroscina (Martins, 1970)
 Neocompsa macrotricha (Martins, 1970)
 Neocompsa magnifica (Martins, 1971)
 Neocompsa mendezi (Giesbert, 1998)
 Neocompsa mexicana (Thomson, 1865)
 Neocompsa micromacula (Martins & Galileo, 1999)
 Neocompsa mimosa (Martins, 1971)
 Neocompsa obscura (Martins, 2009)
 Neocompsa pallida (Martins & Galileo, 2010)
 Neocompsa ptoma (Martins, 1971)
 Neocompsa puncticollis (LeConte, 1873)
 Neocompsa pysma (Martins, 1970)
 Neocompsa quadriplagiata (LeConte, 1873)
 Neocompsa ruatana (Bates, 1892)
 Neocompsa santarensis (Martins & Galileo, 1998)
 Neocompsa schneppi (Wappes & Santos-Silva, 2016)
 Neocompsa sericans (Bates, 1885)
 Neocompsa serrana (Martins, 1962)
 Neocompsa sinaloana (Linsley, 1935)
 Neocompsa spinosa (Martins, 1970)
 Neocompsa squalida (Thomson, 1867)
 Neocompsa tenuissima (Bates, 1885)
 Neocompsa textilis (Thomson, 1865)
 Neocompsa thelgema (Martins, 1971)
 Neocompsa tuberosa (Martins, 1970)
 Neocompsa tucumana (Martins, 1962)
 Neocompsa turnbowi (Giesbert, 1998)
 Neocompsa v-flava (Melzer, 1931)
 Neocompsa ventricosa (Bates, 1885)
 Neocompsa veracruzana (Martins, 1971)
 Neocompsa vogti (Martins, 1970)
 Neocompsa wappesi (Giesbert, 1998)
 Neocompsa werneri (Martins, 1970)

References